Samantha Hayes (born 25 April 1984) is a South African-born New Zealand journalist and newsreader.

Early life and personal life 

Hayes was born in Pietermaritzburg, South Africa to a New Zealand father and a South African mother. The family relocated to Milton in Otago, New Zealand when she was six months old. She has a sister and a brother. She received her education at Tokomairiro High School. She studied at the University of Otago and finished her degree, a Bachelor of Arts, Media & International Relations, at Victoria University of Wellington in 2007.

Hayes has been a vegetarian since she was 11 years old for ethical reasons. She said: "I remember looking at new lambs on the farm and thinking I didn’t want to be responsible for them being killed".

In December 2020, Hayes became engaged to Jay Blaauw, with whom she had her first child, Marlow. He was delivered by caesarean section in late 2019 after Hayes suffered pre-eclampsia. In March 2021, she announced she was pregnant with her second child.

Career 

Hayes first began work at TV3 aged 17, gaining work experience. She was initially a journalist and later became a newsreader. She has worked on the programmes Newshub Late, 3rd Degree, 3D which became 3D Investigates, Newsworthy, Nightline and Firstline. She is currently the news anchor, alongside Mike McRoberts, at Newshub Live at 6pm. She commenced this role on 30 May 2016 after Hilary Barry's resignation.

In July 2018, Hayes won series 7 of the New Zealand version of Dancing with the Stars with her professional partner Aaron Gilmore.

References

1984 births
Living people
People from Milton, New Zealand
People educated at Tokomairiro High School
New Zealand television newsreaders and news presenters
Victoria University of Wellington alumni
Dancing with the Stars (New Zealand TV series) winners